Frontstairs and Backstairs (German:Vordertreppe und Hintertreppe) is a 1915 German silent film directed by Urban Gad and starring Asta Nielsen. It is based on the 1889 play Honour by Hermann Sudermann.

Cast
 Asta Nielsen as Sabine Schulze  
 Paul Otto as Leutnant von Hameln 
 Fred Immler as Kellner Lehmann 
 Victor Arnold as Kommerzienrat Goldsohn  
 Mary Scheller as Frau Goldsohn  
 Senta Eichstaedt as Tochter Goldsohn  
 Alfred Kuehne as Schneider Schulze  
 Adele Reuter-Eichberg as Mutter Schulze

References

Bibliography
 Jennifer M. Kapczynski & Michael D. Richardson. A New History of German Cinema.

External links

1915 films
Films of the German Empire
Films directed by Urban Gad
German silent short films
Films based on works by Hermann Sudermann
German films based on plays
German black-and-white films
1910s German films